Dynasty is a collaborative studio album between producer Tainy and reggaeton singer Yandel. It was released on July 15, 2021, by Neon 16 and Y Entreteiment. The album contains 9 tracks and features guest appearances by Rauw Alejandro and Saint Jhn. The album was made to marked the 16th Anniversary of collaborations between both artists. The first single "Deja Vu" was released on July 2, 2021. To promote the single on the release day, the track was promoted at stadiums on 13 different cities all over United States and Latin America. Eventually, to other singles was released to promote the album: "Si te vas" and "Una mas".

Distany receive positive reviews by critics. It debuted at 25 at US Billboard Top Latin Albums and 49 on Spanis Album Charts.((cn|date=February 2023}}

Tracklist

References 

Reggaeton albums
2021 albums